This is a list of postage stamps and souvenir sheets issued by Pakistan Post from 1947 to 1966.

 1947 to 1966
 1967 to 1976
 1977 to 1986
 1987 to 1996
 1997 to 2006
 2007 to 2016
 2017 to present

1947
 Indian postage stamps overprinted "Pakistan" – 1 October 1947
 19 stamps overprinted with "PAKISTAN" were issued.
 Values: 3P, 1/2 a, 9P, 1a, 1½ a, 2a.3a, 3½ a, 4a, 6a, 8a, 12a, 14a, Rs.1, Rs.2, Rs.5.   
Rs.10, Rs.15, Rs.25

1948
 Independence commemorative – 9 July 1948
Four stamps were issued
 Values: 1½ a, 2½a. 3a, Rs.1, 

These stamps were designed by Abdul Rehman Chughtai
 First regular series (Crescent and Star facing Northeast) – 14 August 1948
20 definitive stamps were issued on this occasion 
Values:  3P, 6P, 9P, 1a, 1½a, 2a, 2½a, 3a, 3½a, 4a, 6a, 8a, 10a, 12a, 
Rs.1, Rs.2, Rs.5, Rs.10, Rs.15, R50

1949

 1st Anniversary of the Death of Quaid-e-Azam – 11 September 1949
 Three stamps were issued on this occasion 
 Values: 1½a, 3a, 10a.

 1st Regular Series (Crescent and Star facing Northwest) – February 1949
Eight stamps were issued on this occasion
Values: 1a, 1½a, 2a, 3a, 6a, 8a, 10a, 12a,

1950

No stamps were issued

1951

 Fourth Anniversary of Independence – 14 August 1951
 Nine stamps were issued on this occasion
 Values: 2½a, 3a, 3½a,(Die I) 3½a,(Die II), 4a, 6a, 8a. 10a, 12a,

1952

 Scinde Dawk Commemorative – 14 August 1952
 Two stamps were issued on this occasion 
 Values: 3a, 12a.

1953

No stamps were issued

1954

 Seventh Anniversary of Independence – 14 August 1954
 Seven stamps were issued on this occasion
 Values: 6p, 9p, 1a, 1½a, 14a, Rs.1, Rs.2

 Conquest of K2 Commemorative – 25 December 1954
One stamp was issued on this occasion
Value: 2a

1955

 Eighth Anniversary of Independence – 14 August 1955
 Five stamps were issued on this occasion
 Values: 2½a (Die I ), 2½a (Die II), 6a, 8a, 12a

10th Anniversary of United Nations  – 24 October 1955
 Two Stamps were issued on this occasion
Values: 1½a, 12a

 Unification of West Pakistan  – 7 December 1955
 Three stamps were issued on this occasion
 Values: 1½a, 2a, 12a,

1956

  The Republic Day Commemorative – 23 March 1956
 One stamp was issued on this occasion
 Value: 2a

  Ninth Anniversary of Independence – 14 August 1956
 One stamp was issued on this occasion
 Value: 2a

  1st Session of National Assembly of Pakistan at Dacca – 1956
 Three stamps were issued on this occasion
 Values:  1½a, 2a, 12a

1957

  First Anniversary of Republic Day – 23 March 1957
 Three stamps were issued on this occasion
 Values: 2½a, 3½a, Rs.10

  Centenary of Struggle for Independence – 10 May 1957
 Two Stamps were issued on this occasion
 Value: 2a

  10th Anniversary of Independence – 14 August 1957
 Three stamps were issued on this occasion
 Values: 1½a, 4a, 12a

1958

  Second anniversary of Republic Day – 23 March 1958
 One stamp was issued on this occasion
 Value: Rs.15

  20th Anniversary of the Death of Muhammad Iqbal – 21 April 1958
 Three stamps were issued on this occasion
 Values: 1½a, 2a, 14a

  10th Anniversary of Human Rights – 10 December 1958
 Two stamps were issued on this occasion
 Values: 1½a, 14a

  Second National Jamboree of Pakistan Boy Scouts – 28 December 1958
 Two stamps were overprinted on this occasion
 Value: 6p, 8a

1959

  Revolution Day – 27 October 1959
 One stamp was overprinted on this occasion
 Value: 6a

 Red Cross Centenary – 19 November 1959
 Two stamps were issued on this occasion
 Values: 2a, 10a

1960

  Armed Forces Day – 10 January 1960
Two stamps were issued on this occasion
Values: 2a, 14a

 1960 – Jammu & Kashmir Definitives Issue – 23 March 1960
 Four stamps were issued on this occasion
 Values: 6p, 2a, 8a, Rs.1

  World Refugee Year – 7 April 1960
 Two stamps were issued on this occasion
 Values: 2a, 10a,

  Golden Jubilee of Punjab Agricultural College, Lyallpur (now Faisalabad) – 10 October 1960
 Two stamps were issued on this occasion
 Values: 2a, 8a,

  Revolution Day Commemoration – 27 October 1960
 Two stamps were issued on this occasion
 Values: 2a, 14a,

 Centenary of King Edward Medical College, Lahore – 16 November 1960
 Two stamps were issued on this occasion
 Values: 2a, 14a,

 International Chamber of Commerce, CAFEA Meeting – 5 December 1960
 One stamp was issued on this occasion
 Value: 14a

 Third Pakistan Boy Scouts National Jamboree, Lahore – 24 December 1960
 One stamp was issued on this occasion
 Value: 2a

1961

 1961 – (Currency Changed 100 Paisa = Re. 1 New Currency Overprint) – 10 January 1961
 Six stamps were overprinted with new currency on this occasion
 Values: 1p, 2p, 3p, 7p, 13p, 13p

 1961–63  5th Definitive Series, "SHAKISTAN" instead of “PAKISTAN” printed in Bangali
 Three stamps were issued on this occasion
 Values: 1p, 2p, 5p

 1961–63  5th Definitives Series
 16 stamps were issued on this occasion
 Values: 1p, 2p, 3p, 5p, 7p, 10p, 13p, 25p, 40p, 50p,75p, 90p, Re.1, Rs.1.25, Rs.2, Rs.5

  Lahore Stamp Exhibition – 12 February 1961
 One stamp was issued on this occasion
 Value: 8a

  Completion of Warsak Hydroelectric Project – 1 July 1961
 One stamp was issued on this occasion
 Value: 40p

 Child Welfare Week – 2 October 1961 
Two stamps were issued on this occasion
Values: 13p, 90p

 Co-operative Day – 4 November 1961
 Two stamps were issued on this occasion
 Values: 13p, 90p

  Police Centenary – 30 November 1961
 Two stamps were issued on this occasion
 Values: 13p, 90p

 Railway Centenary – 31 December 1961
 Two stamps were issued on this occasion
 Values: 13p, 50p

1962

 1st Karachi – Dacca Jet Flight – 6 February 1962
 One stamp was overprinted on this occasion
 Value: 13p,

 Malaria Eradication – 7 April 1962
 Two stamps were issued on this occasion
 Values: 10p, 13p

  New Constitution – 8 June 1962
 One stamp was issued on this occasion
 Value: 40p

 Sports – 14 August 1962
 Four stamps were issued on this occasion
 Values: 7p, 13p, 25p, 40p

 Small Industries – 10 November 1962
Five stamps were issued on this occasion
Values: 7p, 13p, 25p, 40p, 50p

  16th Anniversary of UNICEF – 11 December 1962
 Two stamps were issued on this occasion
 Values: 13p, 40p

 1962–70 – 5th Definitive Series Redrawn Bengali inscription - Die II
 14 stamps were issued on this occasion 
 Values: 1p, 2p, 3p, 5p, 7p, 10p, 13p, 15p, 20p, 25p, 40p, 50p, 75p, 90p

1963
 U.N. Force in West Irian – 15 February 1963
 One stamp was issued on this occasion
 Value: 13p

 National Horse and Cattle Show – 13 March 1963
 One stamp was issued on this occasion
 Value: 13p

 Freedom from Hunger – 21 March 1963
 Two stamps were issued on this occasion
 Values: 13p, 50p

  Second International Dacca Stamp Exhibition – 23 March 1963
 One stamp was overprinted on this occasion
 Value: 13p

 Centenary of the Red Cross – 25 June 1963
 One stamp was issued on this occasion
 Value: 40p

 Archaeological Series – 16 September 1963
 Four stamps were issued on this occasion
 Values: 7p, 13p, 40p, 50p

 Centenary of Public Works Department – 7 October 1963
 One stamp was overprinted on this occasion
 Value: 13p

 25th Death Anniversary of Mustafa Kemal Atatürk – 10 November 1963
One stamp was issued on this occasion
Value: 50p

  15th Anniversary of the Universal Declaration of Human Rights – 10 December 1963
 One stamp was issued on this occasion
 Value: 50p

  Completion of Multan Thermal Power Station – 25 December 1963
 One stamp was issued on this occasion
 Value: 13p

 1963–1968 Eleven stamps already issued now printed on watermarked paper 
 Seven stamps were issued on this occasion
 Values: Rs.1, Rs.1.25, Rs.2, Rs.5, Rs.10, Rs.15, Rs.25

1964
 Nubian Monuments Preservation – 30 March 1964
 Two Stamps were issued on this occasion
 Values: 13p, 50p

 1964 New York World's Fair – 22 April 1964
 Two Stamps were issued on this occasion
 Values: 13p, Rs.1.25

 Bicentenary of Death of Shah Abdul Latif of Bhit – 25 June 1964
 One Stamp  was issued on this occasion
 Value: 50p

 16th Anniversary of Death of Quaid-e-Azam – 11 September 1964
 Two stamps were issued on this occasion
 Values: 15p, 50p

 Universal Children’s Day – 5 October 1964
 One Stamp was issued on this occasion
 Value: 15p

 West Pakistan University of Engineering & Technology 1st Convocation – 21 December 1964
 One stamp was issued on this occasion
 Value: 15p

1965
  Blind Welfare – 28 February 1965
 One stamp was issued on this occasion
 Value: 15p

 Centenary of International Telecommunication Union 17 May 1965
 One stamp was issued on this occasion
 Value: 15p

  International Co-operation Year – 26 June 1965
 Two stamps were issued on this occasion
 Values: 15p, 50p

 First Anniversary of RCD – 21 July 1965
 Two stamps were issued on this occasion
 Values: 15p, 50p

  Pakistan Armed Forces – 25 December 1965
 Three stamps were issued on this occasion
 Values: 7p, 15p, 50p

1966
  Armed Forces Day – 13 February 1966
 One stamp was issued on this occasion
 Value: 15p

 Inauguration of 1st Atomic Reactor of Pakistan, Islamabad – 30 April 1966
 One stamp was issued on this occasion
 Value: 15p
 
 Silver Jubilee of Habib Bank  – 25 August 1966
 One stamp was issued on this occasion
 Value: 15p
 
 Universal Children's Day – 3 October 1966
 One stamp was issued on this occasion
 Value: 15p
 
 20th Anniversary of UNESCO – 24 November 1966
 One stamp was issued on this occasion
 Value: 15p

 Islamabad, New Capital – 29 November 1966
 Two stamps were issued on this occasion
 Values: 15p, 50p

  Foundation of Health and TIBI Research Institute – 3 December 1966
 One stamp was issued on this occasion
 Value: 15p

  90th Birth Anniversary of Quaid-e-Azam – 25 December 1966
 Two stamps were issued on this occasion
 Values: 15p, 50p

References
 Siddiqui Stamps Catalogue - Collect Pakistan Postage Stamps 2011 Edition available at www.pakistanphilately.com Editor: Akhtar ul Islam Siddiqui
 Ron Doubleday and Usman Ali Isani, Pakistan Overprints on Indian Stamps and Postal Stationery 1947–1949, Karachi (1993).

1947
Postage Stamps